Florești is a commune located in Mehedinți County, Oltenia, Romania. It is composed of nine villages: Copăcioasa, Florești, Gârdoaia, Livezi, Moșneni, Peșteana, Peștenuța, Stroești and Zegujani.

References

Communes in Mehedinți County
Localities in Oltenia